The Bennington flag is a version of the American flag associated with the American Revolution Battle of Bennington, from which it derives its name. Its distinguishing feature is the inclusion of a large '76' in the canton, a reference to the year 1776 when the Declaration of Independence was signed.

Description
Like many Revolution era flags, the Bennington features 13 stars and 13 stripes, symbolic of the 13 American colonies that were in a state of rebellion against Great Britain. The Bennington version is easily identified by a large '76' in the canton, recalling the year 1776, when the Declaration of Independence was signed. Another distinctive feature of the Bennington flag is the arrangement of the 13 stripes, with white being outermost (rather than red being outermost as in most US flags). Also, its stars have seven points each (instead of the now-standard five points) and the blue canton is taller than on other flags, spanning nine instead of seven of the thirteen stripes.

The Bennington flag is a popular version of the American flag, and many historic flag dealers carry it. The large '76' makes it easily identifiable as banner from the American Revolution, evoking Spirit of '76 nostalgia.

History
One legend claims that the original Bennington flag was carried off the field by Nathaniel Fillmore and passed down through the Fillmore family, and was, at one time, in the possession of President Millard Fillmore, Nathaniel's grandson. Philetus P. Fillmore flew a Bennington flag in 1877, to commemorate the Battle of Bennington. Mrs. Maude Fillmore Wilson donated the family flag to the Bennington Museum.  Because of the family association, the flag is also referred to as the "Fillmore flag".

Many doubt the actual use of the Fillmore flag at the Battle of Bennington. A Green Mountain Boys flag belonging to John Stark is generally accepted to have been there, but the Bennington flag has become more strongly associated with the event. Both Stark's flag and the Fillmore flag are held in a collection at the Bennington Museum, but the Stark flag is accepted as an 18th-century regimental banner, while the museum has dated the Bennington flag from the 19th century based on the nature of the machine-woven fabric it is made from.  The flag may have been made to evoke revolutionary sentiment during the War of 1812 (fought against the United Kingdom), or to celebrate the 50th anniversary of the Declaration of Independence in 1826.  The curator of textiles in the Smithsonian Institution's National Museum of History and Technology speculated that the flag may even have been a centennial banner, made c. 1876.

References

External links
 A60 Flag at the Bennington Museum, with dating details.
 Sites describing the older history:
 The Stars and Stripes at HomeOfHeroes.com
 Flag Picture Gallery by the Independence Hall Association, at UShistory.org.
 Bennington Flag History
 Bennington Flag A grouping of ten historical U.S. flags including the Bennington.

Flags of the American Revolution